Mary Lou Petty (April 5, 1915 – April 2, 2014), also known by her married name Mary Lou Skok, was an American competition swimmer. She competed at the 1936 Summer Olympics and placed fourth in the 400-meter freestyle event.

Petty was born in Spokane, Washington.  She was an adept swimmer by the age of 8 and began swimming competitively at the age of 13. She had originally prepared to compete in the 1932 Summer Olympics, but the failure of her family's business during the Great Depression prevented her from acquiring the necessary financial backing.  After becoming engaged to Bob Skok and taking a job as a secretary at Montgomery Ward, she moved to Seattle and qualified for the 400-meter freestyle at the 1936 Summer Games, having swum out of the Washington Athletic Club for the past three years. During this inter-Olympic period she set several national records. Her roommate on the boat to Berlin was Eleanor Holm Jarrett. Despite food poisoning, she managed to place fourth in the competition and later recalled observing both German Leader Adolf Hitler and athlete Jesse Owens at the Games. Upon her return to New York, she married Skok and eventually moved to Los Angeles, after he decided to pursue optometry. During World War II she helped build wings for the Lockheed Hudson bomber and the two remained together until his death on March 27, 1998. Until her death she resided in Arizona. She died on April 2, 2014, at the age of 98.

References

1915 births
2014 deaths
American female freestyle swimmers
Olympic swimmers of the United States
Sportspeople from Spokane, Washington
Swimmers at the 1936 Summer Olympics
21st-century American women